Jochem Bobeldijk (12 April 1920 Zaandam – 18 November 2010, Egmond aan Zee) was a Dutch sprint canoer who competed in the late 1940s and the early 1950s. Competing in two Summer Olympics, he earned his best finish of sixth in the K-1 10000 m event at London in 1948.

References
Jochem Bobeldijk's profile at Sports Reference.com
Jochem Bobeldijk's obituary 

1920 births
2010 deaths
Canoeists at the 1948 Summer Olympics
Canoeists at the 1952 Summer Olympics
Dutch male canoeists
Olympic canoeists of the Netherlands
Sportspeople from Zaanstad
20th-century Dutch people
21st-century Dutch people